Klaus Brandner (born 30 January 1990) is a German former alpine ski racer.

He competed at the 2015 World Championships in Beaver Creek, USA, in the Super-G.

References

External links 
FIS profile

1990 births
German male alpine skiers
Living people
21st-century German people